Şatırlı or Shatyrly may refer to:
Şatırlı, Barda, Azerbaijan
Şatırlı, Jalilabad, Azerbaijan